Edward William Williamson was the Bishop of Swansea and Brecon in the Church in Wales from 1939 until his death on 23 September 1953.

Williamson was born on 22 April 1892.  He was educated at The Cathedral School, Llandaff, Westminster School and Christ Church, Oxford, and was ordained in 1915.

He began his ordained ministry with curacies at  St Martin's Leeds and All Saints' South Lambeth, after which he was a lecturer at St Augustine's College, Canterbury. From 1926 to 1939 he was Warden of St Michael's Theological College, Llandaff, when he was appointed to the episcopate.  On 26 July 1949, as Bishop of Swansea and Brecon, he dedicated the new St Martin's (Dunvant), which was possibly the first church to be dedicated in Wales after the Second World War.

References

1892 births
1953 deaths
People educated at Westminster School, London
Alumni of Christ Church, Oxford
Bishops of Swansea and Brecon
20th-century bishops of the Church in Wales
Holders of a Lambeth degree
Academics of St Augustine's College, Canterbury
People educated at The Cathedral School, Llandaff